Tôn Đức Thắng (August 20, 1888 – March 30, 1980) was the second president of Vietnam under the leadership of General Secretary Lê Duẩn. The position of president is ceremonial and Thắng was never a major policymaker or even a member of the Politburo, Vietnam's ruling council. He served as president, initially of North Vietnam from September 2, 1969, and later of a united Vietnam, until his death in 1980.

Tôn Đức Thắng was a key Vietnamese nationalist and Communist political figure, was chairman of the National Assembly's Standing Committee 1955–1960 and served as the vice president to Hồ Chí Minh from 1960 to 1969. He died at the age of 91, he was the oldest head of a state with the title "president" (subsequently surpassed by Hastings Banda).

Early life 
Tôn Đức Thắng was born to Tôn Văn Đề and Nguyễn Thị Di on Ông Hô Island along the Mekong River, roughly four kilometres from Long Xuyên, the capital of An Giang Province. From 1897 to 1901, Thắng received his education in Chinese script, history and philosophy from a private tutor in Long Xuyên. This tutor, an anti-colonialist, carried a heavy influence on the early development of Thắng's political beliefs . Afterwards, he learned French at an elementary school in Long Xuyên. Thắng lived with his parents until 1906, when he moved to Saigon.

In 1919, in the Black Sea when he was with the French Navy, Thắng claimed to participate in a plot with fellow sailors to turn over the French armored cruiser Waldeck-Rousseau to the enemy Bolshevik revolutionaries. He continued to participate in rebellious activities against the French, was member of Vietnamese Revolutionary Youth Association since 1927; and in 1929, he was imprisoned by the French at Saigon, deported to Côn Sơn Prison. He remained there until 1945 and immediately rose again into the public eye. After Hồ Chí Minh's Viet Minh came into power in August 1945, Thắng became the member Cochinchina Party Committee of CPV, member Administration Resistance Committee of Cochinchina and since 1946, the presiding member of the National Assembly. In 1947, he became a member of the Central Committee of the Communist Party of Vietnam.

A challenge of events
Christoph Giebel, Associate Professor of International Studies and History at the University of Washington and author of the book, Imagined Ancestries of Vietnamese Communism: Ton Duc Thang and the Politics of History and Memory, argues that from the basic outline of the mutiny and determines from his examination of historical evidence, such as ship logs, that Thắng apparently did not participate in a mutiny on a French ship sent to the Black Sea in 1919 to help defeat Bolsheviks. He argues that it was a fabricated story that linked Vietnamese communism with the October Revolution in Russia, which was recounted across the Communist world in the 1950s. Giebel highlights disagreements over Thắng's involvement with a Saigon labour union in the 1920s and the naval-yard strike there in 1925.

Nevertheless, stories of Tôn Đức Thắng actions remain as is in Vietnamese folklore.

Career in North Vietnam

Rise to power 
Thắng also served as president of the Lien Viet during the rebellion against the French from 1946 to 1954. However, the organization was dissolved after the Geneva Convention in 1954 which gave the Viet Minh sole control over North Vietnam. Thắng then took over another organization, the Vietnamese Fatherland Front, a Communist pro-government nationalist group. Thắng led the Fatherland Front in its conquest to draw supporters from South Vietnam. He received the Stalin Peace Award in 1955 as a result.

Thắng's work with trying to win over South Vietnam also helped lead him to becoming the Vice President of North Vietnam under Hồ Chí Minh in 1960. In 1967, when he was still vice president, Thắng won the Lenin Peace Prize, a yearly prize similar to the Nobel Peace Prize, but given out by the Soviet Union. After Hồ Chí Minh's death in 1969, Thắng succeeded him as president. Most of the real power, however, was vested in Communist Party leader Lê Duẩn.

Fall of Saigon 
With the fall of Saigon on April 30, 1975, the pro-Communist Provisional Revolutionary Government took control of the South. This allowed for the future reunification of Vietnam as the Socialist Republic of Vietnam, which was formalized on July 2, 1976. Presently, April 30 is recognized as a public holiday in Vietnam known as Reunification Day, even though it was not until July 2 that the two countries became officially united as one nation. Thắng became the first president of the reunified country.

President of reunified Vietnam 
With the end of the Vietnam War and with the South Vietnamese government ousted, Thắng was easily able to keep his control over the unstable new nation during the middle and late 1970s. The unified Vietnam under Thắng experienced early troubles, as political and economic conditions were deteriorating and millions of South Vietnamese were fleeing the country as boat people. As the leader of the united Socialist Republic of Vietnam, Thắng worked hard for several years on a massive reconstruction effort to rebuild both former North and South Vietnam's which were left devastated by years of war which included special projects such as rebuilding the industry, infrastructure, and economy.

Deposing of the Khmer Rouge 

Troubles with the newly formed Vietnamese government further progressed in early 1978 when Thắng approached the Soviet Union for help in deposing the Khmer Rouge in Cambodia, which was aligned with People's Republic of China (PRC). The situation seemed like a golden opportunity for the Soviet Union because they knew that the Vietnamese army could easily defeat Cambodian forces. A Vietnamese victory would weaken the only aligned nation with the People's Republic of China in Southeast Asia and demonstrate the superiority of being aligned with the Soviet Union. The growing tensions between the PRC and the Soviet Union had drastically escalated the situation in the area. The Soviet Union was anxious about the future outcome of a war by proxy between Vietnam and Cambodia.

On December 25, 1978, after months of growing border conflicts and an influx of Cambodians seeking refuge in Vietnam, the Vietnamese army invaded Cambodia. By January 7, 1979, the Vietnamese had easily captured the capital of Cambodia, Phnom Penh, and deposed the Khmer Rouge régime. However, the Soviet Union's diplomatic victory was short-lived. The PRC was now being backed by the United States, and they increasingly showed signs of being close to war with Vietnam. The Soviets knew that they could not go help the Vietnamese if the PRC decided to invade Vietnam.

Not surprisingly, on February 15, 1979, the People's Republic of China officially announced plans to invade Vietnam, thus ending the crucial and significant Sino-Soviet Treaty of Friendship, which had been signed in 1950. The PRC claimed that the invasion was as a result of mistreatment of ethnic Chinese and the Vietnamese presence on the PRC's Spratly Islands.

On February 17, a PRC force of about 200,000 troops had crossed into Thắng's country, and they immediately started to invade Vietnamese cities and towns along Vietnam's northern border. Thắng had left an army of 100,000 men to fight off the PRC, and heavy casualties were reported from both sides. With the Chinese not wanting to linger in Vietnam any longer, they started to move out of the country less than a month later, on March 16. China's early exit from the country drew up much confusion to who was the victor of the Sino-Vietnamese War. Thắng proclaimed that Vietnam had won the war, while his counterpart in China, Ye Jianying, proclaimed a Chinese victory. However, one thing is sure about the Sino-Vietnamese War's outcome: Thắng's Vietnam was able to successfully depose the Khmer Rouge from power in Cambodia.

Death and legacy 
Tôn Đức Thắng died on March 30, 1980, in Hanoi, a little more than a year after the conclusion of the Sino-Vietnamese War, at the age of 91 from a heart seizure and respiratory failure. He was the oldest ever president of a country in the world. He was succeeded by one of his vice presidents, Nguyễn Hữu Thọ. He is buried in Mai Dịch Cemetery in the section reserved for the graves of government leaders and famous revolutionaries.

Even though Thắng had been the first president of the reunited Socialist Republic of Vietnam, he has not attained the same reverence as his predecessor, Hồ Chí Minh, had received from the Vietnamese people. Thắng served as the nation's leader during the pivotal time when North Vietnam and South Vietnam were reunified as one. However, it was also a time when the country showed signs of exhaustion from 30 years of wars, with the Vietnam People's Army engaged in a long, costly war in Cambodia and Northern border. The economy collapsed in the wake of a failed attempt to collectivize the southern economy, some key party members such as Bùi Tín and Hoàng Văn Hoan defected. It was under his rule that Vietnam survived the subsidy period. Later in 1986, the Sixth Party's Congress passed the Renovation policy which recognized the failure of collectivization and liberalized the economy, opening a new chapter in Vietnam's history.

Tôn Đức Thắng University, a top research university in Ho Chi Minh City, was named after him. Many avenues and roads in major metropolises are also named after him.

See also 
 Sino-Soviet border conflict
 History of Vietnam
 Tôn Đức Thắng University
 Vietnam War

Notes

References 
 Ton Duc Thang Infoplease 
 Ton Duc Thang Encyclopædia Britannica
 Ton Duc Thang HighBeam Encyclopedia
 Kelley, Liam, Book review: Imagined Ancestries of Vietnamese Communism: Ton Duc Thang and the Politics of History and Memory Canadian Journal of History, Autumn 2006

External links 

 Đại học Tôn Đức Thắng (Tôn Đức Thắng University)
 Interview: Christoph Giebel on BBC
 Kelley, Liam, Book review: Imagined Ancestries of Vietnamese Communism: Ton Duc Thang and the Politics of History and Memory Canadian Journal of History, Autumn 2006 

1888 births
1980 deaths
People from An Giang Province
Presidents of Vietnam
Vice presidents of Vietnam
Chairmen of the Standing Committee of the National Assembly (Vietnam)
Stalin Peace Prize recipients
Recipients of the Order of Lenin
Members of the 2nd Central Committee of the Workers' Party of Vietnam
Members of the 3rd Central Committee of the Workers' Party of Vietnam
Members of the 4th Central Committee of the Communist Party of Vietnam